Rhadine balesi is a species of ground beetle in the subfamily Platyninae that can be found in North America.

Beetles described in 1937
Beetles of North America
Platyninae